Tropical Storm Norma was the fourteenth named tropical cyclone of the 1970 Pacific hurricane season. The storm formed off the coast of Mexico and intensified rapidly, peaking as a strong tropical storm on September 3, before starting a weakening trend. It dissipated before making landfall on Baja California.

While the storm never made landfall, the remnants from the storm fueled the Labor Day Storm of 1970, causing floods in Arizona that resulted in heavy damage and loss of life. The rainfall from this storm broke records, mostly for 24-hour rainfall totals. Despite not being tropical when the damages were done, Norma is considered to be the deadliest system in Arizona history.

Meteorological history

A tropical disturbance was first noted in a satellite picture taken on August 30. The system later went through rapid intensification, becoming a tropical depression on August 31 and Tropical Storm Norma later that day. Satellite pictures showed cirrus outflow was greater in the tops of the feeder bands than in the eyewall chimney. On September 3, Navy reconnaissance reported a 992 mbar pressure, Norma's lowest.

Shortly after the 992 mbar report, however, Norma began to weaken. Despite the sudden drop in winds, the minimum pressure remained around 994 mbar. The weakening became obvious on satellite presentation, which showed cool inflow and a sheet of stratocumulus clouds around the west semicircle extending under the storm clouds. Norma continued to weaken, degrading into a depression by September 4. At this point, the circulation forced moist and unstable
maritime air into Arizona which resulted in disastrous floods during Labor Day along with a slow moving cold front. This system would become known as the Labor Day Storm of 1970. On September 5, a cloud spiral was still visible west of Baja California, but the storm's circulation dissipated, with the remnants of the storm finally dissipating on September 6, just before making landfall on Baja California.

Impact
While Norma did not make landfall while tropical (even though it came close to making landfall on Baja California before dissipating), the circulation introduced unstable air into Arizona and Utah which, along with a cold front, resulted in record amounts of rainfall.

Baja California

For an  stretch of the coat,  waves were measured.

Arizona
The rainfall in Arizona produced deadly flash floods which caused over $1 million in damages and killed 23 people, 14 of whom died when Tonto Creek, which was in the vicinity of Kohl's Ranch, became flooded. Other deaths were reported among automobile drivers. Total rainfall exceeded 7 inches in certain locations, with Workman's Creek receiving  of rain. Other amounts were recorded in Upper Parker Creek (9.09 inches), Mount Lemmon (8.74 inches), Sunflower (8.44 inches), Kitt Peak (8.08 inches), Tonto Creek Fish Hatchery (7.12 inches), and Crown King (7.02 inches). There were also reports of injuries by campers in Mogollon Rim and Scottsdale reported significant property damage. As many as 23 lives were lost due to the unprecedented nature of the floods, with 14 deaths reported from flash flooding near Tonto Creek. The major flooding in the state prompted a presidential disaster declaration.

Utah
While the storm was causing floods in Arizona, the lower cities of Utah were also experiencing heavy rainfall. The most noteworthy rainfall total was recorded in Bug Creek, which experienced an estimated  of rain in a 24-hour period. No deaths or damage was reported in connection to the storm.

Records
When  of rain fell at Workman's Creek in a 24-hour period, it became the highest amount of rain to fall in Arizona in a 24-hour period. The record stood until 1997, when the remnants of Hurricane Nora produced  of rain on the top of Harquahala Mountain.

A similar record was recorded in Utah when  of rain fell in Bug Creek in a 24-hour period. Unlike the Arizona rainfall record, this record still stands today.

When the rains of Norma caused the San Juan River to flood its banks, a size of 1,090 m3 was obtained, making this the largest flood of the San Juan since 1962, when the Navajo Dam was completed. The most runoff from the storm was downstream from the reservoir.

With 23 associated deaths in Arizona, Norma was the deadliest storm in the state's history.

See also

 List of tropical cyclones
 List of Pacific hurricanes
 List of wettest tropical cyclones in Arizona
 Hurricane Nora (1997) - 1997 hurricane in the East Pacific that produced gale-force winds and heavy rainfall in the Southwestern United States.
 Other storms with the same name

References

External links

 Monthly Weather Reports from up to 1972 (PDF files).
 A more extensive collection of Monthly Weather Reports up to and including 2006 (PDF files.

Norma
Norma 1970
Norma 1970
Tropical Storm Norma
Tropical Storm Norma
Hurricanes and tropical depressions of the Gulf of California
1970 in Arizona
Hurricanes in Baja California Sur
Hurricanes in Baja California
Hurricanes in Sonora
Hurricanes in Utah